Kurt Imhof (* 1914; † unknown) was a Swiss footballer who played for FC Basel. He played in the position of goalkeeper.

Between the years 1932 and 1935 and again between 1938 and 1947 Imhof played a total of 128 games for Basel. 85 of these games were in the Swiss Nationalliga, five were in the 1 Liga (second highest tier) and 15 were in the Swiss Cup. The other 22 were friendly games.

He was a member of the Basel team that won the Swiss Cup in the 1932–33 season. The final was played in the Hardturm stadium against Grasshopper Club. Basel won 4–3 and achieved the club's first ever national title.

Honours
 Swiss Cup winner: 1932–33

References

Sources
 Rotblau: Jahrbuch Saison 2017/2018. Publisher: FC Basel Marketing AG. 
 Verein "Basler Fussballarchiv" Homepage

FC Basel players
FC Nordstern Basel players
Swiss men's footballers
Association football goalkeepers
1914 births
Year of death missing
FC Kreuzlingen players